Bohuslav Svoboda (born 8 February 1944) is a Czech politician and physician who has been serving as the mayor of Prague since 16 February 2023. He previously served as the mayor of Prague from 30 November 2010 to 23 May 2013.

Biography
Bohuslav Svoboda was born on 8 February 1944 in Prague, Protectorate of Bohemia and Moravia (today the Czech Republic). He also attended the Charles University.

In the 2022 Prague municipal election Svoboda was leader of the coalition SPOLU and SPOLU won the election. Forming a coalition with Czech Pirate Party and STAN took 5 months of negotiations. On 16 February 2023 Svoboda was elected again as a mayor of Prague.

Svoboda is a member of the Civic Democratic Party.

See also
 One World Film Festival

References

External links

Living people
1944 births
Mayors of Prague
Politicians from Prague
Czechoslovak physicians
Charles University alumni
Civic Democratic Party (Czech Republic) MPs
Civic Democratic Party (Czech Republic) mayors
Members of the Chamber of Deputies of the Czech Republic (2017–2021)
Members of the Chamber of Deputies of the Czech Republic (2013–2017)
Members of the Chamber of Deputies of the Czech Republic (2021–2025)